Ōrākei Ward is one of thirteen wards of Auckland Council in Auckland, New Zealand. It encompasses the neighbourhoods of Saint Heliers, Glendowie, Kohimarama, Mission Bay, Saint Johns and Meadowbank. It elects one councillor to represent the ward on the council. The councillor has oversight over the Orakei Local Board. The current councillor is Desley Simpson.

Demographics

Ōrākei ward had a population of 84,318 at the 2018 New Zealand census, an increase of 4,779 people (6.0%) since the 2013 census, and an increase of 9,798 people (13.1%) since the 2006 census. There were 29,910 households, comprising 40,401 males and 43,920 females, giving a sex ratio of 0.92 males per female. The median age was 40.0 years (compared with 37.4 years nationally), with 15,435 people (18.3%) aged under 15 years, 15,813 (18.8%) aged 15 to 29, 39,735 (47.1%) aged 30 to 64, and 13,338 (15.8%) aged 65 or older.

Ethnicities were 72.6% European/Pākehā, 5.7% Māori, 3.2% Pacific peoples, 22.9% Asian, and 3.5% other ethnicities. People may identify with more than one ethnicity.

The percentage of people born overseas was 37.9, compared with 27.1% nationally.

Although some people chose not to answer the census's question about religious affiliation, 45.7% had no religion, 40.9% were Christian, 0.4% had Māori religious beliefs, 2.3% were Hindu, 1.2% were Muslim, 2.1% were Buddhist and 2.4% had other religions.

Of those at least 15 years old, 31,257 (45.4%) people had a bachelor's or higher degree, and 4,686 (6.8%) people had no formal qualifications. The median income was $47,900, compared with $31,800 nationally. 23,628 people (34.3%) earned over $70,000 compared to 17.2% nationally. The employment status of those at least 15 was that 36,147 (52.5%) people were employed full-time, 10,083 (14.6%) were part-time, and 1,956 (2.8%) were unemployed.

Councillors

Election Results 
Election Results for the Ōrākei Ward:

2022 Election Results

References 

Ōrākei Local Board Area
Wards of the Auckland Region